The Central Oregonian is a twice-weekly newspaper published in Prineville in the U.S. state of Oregon. Tracing its roots to 1881, the paper covers Central Oregon where it is the newspaper of record for Crook County.

In 1921, a merger of the Prineville Call and the Crook County Journal formed the Central Oregonian. The Journal had previously absorbed the Mitchell Monitor.
Doris Donnelly owned the Central Oregonian prior to Elmo Smith. 
Elmo Smith owned the paper until his death in 1968,when his son Denny Smith took over ownership of the Central Oregonian and other newspapers that became Eagle Newspapers. Eagle sold the paper to the Pamplin Media Group in June 2013.  As of 2014, the paper was published on Tuesdays and Fridays and had a paid circulation of 2,652.

In October 2018, implemented a paywall on its website, under which users are permitted free access to three stories per calendar month, after which payment of per-story fee is required for non-subscribers.

References

External links

1881 establishments in Oregon
Newspapers published by Pamplin Media Group
Newspapers published in Oregon
Oregon Newspaper Publishers Association
Prineville, Oregon
Publications established in 1881